Avhane is a village of Shevgaon Taluka of Ahmednagar district in the state of Maharashtra, India. This village is split in two parts as Avahne Budruk and Avhane Khurda . Avhane Budruk is famous for the temple of "Nidrista Ganapati", the Ganapati in the sleeping pose. There are only two Nidrista Ganapati: one in Chinchwad (Morya Gosavi), near Pune, and another one in the Avahne.

References

Villages in Ahmednagar district